"Don't You Know I Love You" is the 1951, debut single by The Clovers.  The single was the first of three singles to make the top spot on the R&B charts. Al Schmitt helped engineer the recording.

References

1951 singles
The Clovers songs
1951 songs
Song articles with missing songwriters